Miguel Bordón (27 October 1952 – 16 June 2003) was an Argentine footballer. He played in four matches for the Argentina national football team in 1979. He was also part of Argentina's squad for the 1979 Copa América tournament.

References

External links
 

1952 births
2003 deaths
Argentine footballers
Argentina international footballers
Association football defenders
Sportspeople from Rosario, Santa Fe